Hany Elbehiry is a paralympic athlete from Egypt competing mainly in category F58 shot put events.

Hany has competed in three Paralympics winning 5 medals.  His first games were in 1996 where he won silver in both the F57 shot put and discus. In the 2000 Summer Paralympics  he won a second shot put silver in the F58 class and also won the bronze medal in the javelin but could not match his 1996 performance in the discus only managing to finish fourth behind two Egyptian teammates. His third and final games in 2004  brought him a third medal in the shot put, this time a bronze.

References

Paralympic athletes of Egypt
Athletes (track and field) at the 1996 Summer Paralympics
Athletes (track and field) at the 2000 Summer Paralympics
Athletes (track and field) at the 2004 Summer Paralympics
Paralympic silver medalists for Egypt
Paralympic bronze medalists for Egypt
Living people
Medalists at the 1996 Summer Paralympics
Medalists at the 2000 Summer Paralympics
Medalists at the 2004 Summer Paralympics
Year of birth missing (living people)
Paralympic medalists in athletics (track and field)
Egyptian male discus throwers
Egyptian male shot putters
Wheelchair discus throwers
Wheelchair shot putters
Paralympic discus throwers
Paralympic shot putters